Tokhm-e Balut may refer to:
 Tokhm-e Balut-e Olya
 Tokhm-e Balut-e Sofla